ICRF can refer to:

 Imperial Cancer Research Fund, a cancer research organization in the United Kingdom
 International Celestial Reference Frame, a reference frame in astrometry and astronomy
 The Israel Cancer Research Fund, a North American charitable organization that supports cancer research in Israel
 Ion cyclotron resonance frequency